Gabriel ("Gaby") Antonio Miranda (born 20 August 1968 in Montevideo) is an Uruguayan - Venezuelan football midfielder who made a total number of seventeen appearances (three goals) for the Venezuela national team between 1994 and 1997.

Club career
He started his professional career at Caracas FC, and also played in Argentina, Ecuador and Mexico.

References

External links

1968 births
Living people
Footballers from Montevideo
Venezuelan footballers
Venezuela international footballers
Association football midfielders
Caracas FC players
Deportivo Italia players
Atlante F.C. footballers
C.S. Emelec footballers
Club Atlético Platense footballers
Deportivo Táchira F.C. players
Liga MX players
1991 Copa América players
1995 Copa América players
1997 Copa América players
Expatriate footballers in Argentina
Expatriate footballers in Mexico
Expatriate footballers in Ecuador
Expatriate footballers in Venezuela